Urvashi Bharathi is a 1973 Indian Malayalam-language film, directed by Thikkurissy Sukumaran Nair and produced by Ramachandran. The film stars Prem Nazir, Jayabharathi, Innocent and Adoor Bhasi. The film had musical score by V. Dakshinamoorthy. and story A.V. Francis.

Cast 

Prem Nazir
Vincent
Sudheer
Raghavan
Adoor Bhasi
Thikkurissy Sukumaran Nair
T. S. Muthaiah
Paul Vengola
Bahadoor
Kaduvakulam Antony
Pattom Sadan
N. Govindankutty
Paravoor Bharathan
Innocent
Jayabharathi
Meena
Sadhana

Soundtrack 
The music was composed by V. Dakshinamoorthy and the lyrics were written by Thikkurissy Sukumaran Nair.

References

External links 
 

1973 films
1970s Malayalam-language films
Films directed by Thikkurissy Sukumaran Nair